Buzaglo is a surname of Moroccan Jewish origin which today is mostly found in Israel. Notable people with the surname include:

Asi Buzaglo, Israeli footballer
Jacob Buzaglo, Israeli footballer 
Maor Buzaglo, Israeli footballer
Shalom Buzaglo, Moroccan kabbalist
Tim Buzaglo, footballer and cricketer
William Buzaglo, English inventor

Maghrebi Jewish surnames
Surnames of Moroccan origin